Frederick Bullock (1851–1931) was an Adelaide real-estate agent and mayor.

Frederick or Fred Bullock may refer to:

Frederick Bullock (Royal Navy officer) (1788–1874)
Frederick Bullock (police officer) (1847–1914)
Fred Bullock (1886–1922), English footballer
Fred Bullock (golfer) (1918–2006), English golfer